Platynomorpha is a genus of flies in the family Stratiomyidae.

Distribution
Democratic Republic of the Congo, Liberia, Republic of the Congo, Equatorial Guinea, Cameroun.

Species
Platynomorpha doryphora Grünberg, 1915

References

Stratiomyidae
Brachycera genera
Taxa named by Karl Grünberg
Diptera of Africa